Kim Dong-yong (born 12 December 1990 in Sancheong) is a South Korean rower. At the 2012 Summer Olympics, he finished in 22nd place in the men's single sculls.  He placed 17th in the men's single sculls event at the 2016 Summer Olympics.

References

1990 births
Living people
South Korean male rowers
Olympic rowers of South Korea
Rowers at the 2016 Summer Olympics
Asian Games medalists in rowing
Rowers at the 2010 Asian Games
Rowers at the 2014 Asian Games
Asian Games silver medalists for South Korea
Asian Games bronze medalists for South Korea
Medalists at the 2010 Asian Games
Medalists at the 2014 Asian Games
Rowers at the 2018 Asian Games
Medalists at the 2018 Asian Games
Rowers at the 2012 Summer Olympics
20th-century South Korean people
21st-century South Korean people